4176 Sudek, provisional designation , is a Themistian asteroid from the outer regions of the asteroid belt, approximately  in diameter. It was discovered on 24 February 1987, by Czech astronomer Antonín Mrkos at the Kleť Observatory in the Czech Republic. The presumed C-type asteroid has a rotation period of 8.16 hours. It was named in memory of Czech photographer Josef Sudek.

Orbit and classification 

Sudek is a Themistian asteroid that belongs to the Themis family, a very large family of carbonaceous asteroids, named after 24 Themis.

It orbits the Sun in the outer main-belt at a distance of 2.7–3.5 AU once every 5 years and 6 months (1,994 days; semi-major axis of 3.1 AU). Its orbit has an eccentricity of 0.14 and an inclination of 3° with respect to the ecliptic.

Occultation 

On 21 January 2014 Sudek, at magnitude 15.5, occulted the star 2UCAC 39655315 in the constellation Gemini during which the magnitude dropped from 11.8 (star) to 15.5 (asteroid). This event was visible over parts of Japan and China.

Physical characteristics 

Sudek is an assumed carbonaceous C-type asteroid, in line with the Themis family's overall spectral type.

Rotation period 

In September 2012, a rotational lightcurve of Sudek was obtained from photometric observations in the R-band by astronomers at the Palomar Transient Factory in California. Lightcurve analysis gave a rotation period of 8.164 hours with a brightness amplitude of 0.32 magnitude.

Diameter and albedo 

According to the surveys carried out by the Japanese Akari satellite and the NEOWISE mission of NASA's Wide-field Infrared Survey Explorer, Sudek measures between 14.51 and 18.858 kilometers in diameter and its surface has an albedo between 0.095 and 0.12.

The Collaborative Asteroid Lightcurve Link assumes an albedo of 0.08 and calculates a diameter of 15.86 kilometers based on an absolute magnitude of 12.36.

Naming 

Based on a proposal by Miloš Tichý, this minor planet was named after Czech photographer Josef Sudek (1896–1976), known for his black-and-white series of still lifes and panoramas of Prague. The official naming citation was published by the Minor Planet Center on 11 February 1998.

References

External links 
 Asteroid Lightcurve Database (LCDB), query form (info )
 Dictionary of Minor Planet Names, Google books
 Discovery Circumstances: Numbered Minor Planets (1)-(5000) – Minor Planet Center
 
 

004176
Discoveries by Antonín Mrkos
Named minor planets
19870224